Akamptogonus novarae is a species of flat-backed millipede in the family Paradoxosomatidae. It can be found in Australia, North America, and Oceania.

References

Further reading

 

Polydesmida
Articles created by Qbugbot
Animals described in 1869